is a former Japanese football player.

Playing career
Tanioku was born in Nabari on October 18, 1978. After graduating from high school, he joined Japan Football League club Ventforet Kofu in 1997. The club was promoted to new league J2 League from 1999. He played many matches from 1999 and became a regular player as side back in 2000. However the club finished at bottom place for 3 years in a row (1999-2001). In 2003, he moved to Japan Football League (JFL) club Otsuka Pharmaceutical (later Tokushima Vortis). He played many matches and the club won the champions in 2005 and was promoted to J2 from 2005. In 2006, he moved to JFL club Sagawa Express Osaka (later Sagawa Shiga). Although he played many matches in 2006, he could not play many matches from 2007 and retired end of 2009 season.

Club statistics

References

External links

1978 births
Living people
Association football people from Mie Prefecture
Japanese footballers
J2 League players
Japan Football League (1992–1998) players
Japan Football League players
Ventforet Kofu players
Tokushima Vortis players
Sagawa Shiga FC players
Association football defenders